Stephen Douglas Allan (born 18 October 1973) is an Australian professional golfer.

Allan was born in Melbourne. His parents emigrated from Edinburgh, Scotland three years before he was born. He turned professional in 1996 and was a member of the European Tour from 1997 to 2000. In 1998, his second season in Europe, he won the German Open and finished sixteenth on the Order of Merit, and that remains his most successful year. His other professional win came in his home country, at the 2002 Australian Open. From 2001 to 2005 he was a member of the U.S.-based PGA Tour, with his best finishes being second placings at the Greater Milwaukee Open in 2003, and the Reno-Tahoe Open in 2004.

In 2006, he played on the Nationwide Tour in the United States, before regaining his PGA Tour card at the 2006 Qualifying School.

Amateur wins
1995 New South Wales Medal, Lake Macquarie Amateur

Professional wins (2)

European Tour wins (1)

PGA Tour of Australasia wins (1)

*Note: The 2002 Holden Australian Open was shortened to 54 holes due to weather.

Playoff record
PGA Tour playoff record (0–1)

Results in major championships

CUT = missed the half-way cut
"T" = tied
NT = No tournament due to COVID-19 pandemic
Note: Allan never played in the Masters Tournament or the PGA Championship.

Results in The Players Championship

CUT = missed the halfway cut

Team appearances
Amateur
Australian Men's Interstate Teams Matches (representing Victoria): 1993 (winners), 1994 (winners), 1995

See also
2000 PGA Tour Qualifying School graduates
2001 PGA Tour Qualifying School graduates
2006 PGA Tour Qualifying School graduates

References

External links

Australian male golfers
PGA Tour of Australasia golfers
European Tour golfers
PGA Tour golfers
Golfers from Melbourne
Australian people of Scottish descent
1973 births
Living people